The Miami Valley Conference is an OHSAA athletic league whose members are located in the Ohio counties of Hamilton County and Butler County. The league was established in 1979

Current members

Football Alignment • 2021-present 
With Purcell Marian and Roger Bacon as Full Members starting in 2021, North College Hill moved to the Scarlet division for Football only

For other sports division alignment varies by sport

References

External links
Miami Valley Conference Home Page

See also
Ohio High School Athletic Conferences

Ohio high school sports conferences